The Tour Challenge is a bonspiel, or curling tournament, and is a Grand Slam of Curling event. It was introduced into the Grand Slam lineup starting in the 2015–16 curling season.

Past champions

Men

Tier 1

Tier 2

Women

Tier 1

Tier 2

References

External links

 
Men's Grand Slam (curling) events
Women's Grand Slam (curling) events
Annual sporting events in Canada